The Colorado Mountain Club (CMC), formed in 1912, is a nonprofit, 501 (c)(3) outdoor education organization based in Golden, Colorado that gathers and disseminates information regarding Colorado's mountains in the areas of art, science, literature and recreation. The club advocates for the preservation of the alpine regions, and was instrumental in the creation of Rocky Mountain National Park. The CMC has its own press with over 30 published titles, and has continuously published Trail & Timberline magazine since 1918.

History
From 25 charter members in 1912, the club rapidly grew to 200 members barely a year later, when the CMC became a nonprofit corporation. Charter members included such notable historic figures as Enos Mills, Roger Toll, and Carl Blaurock.

In 1974, the club purchased its first permanent home in Denver, Colorado. In 1993, the CMC partnered with the American Alpine Club to found the American Mountaineering Center in Golden, Colorado. The building houses the largest mountaineering library in the world, as well as a state-of-the-art museum, which opened in February, 2008, and is named for famed mountaineer Henry Bradford Washburn Jr.

Groups
The CMC has a state-level organization along with 14 local groups, serving communities such as Denver, Boulder, Colorado Springs, Pueblo, and Aspen.

Education
The club first ventured into education by forming a mountaineering school in 1939.  Today, the club offers classes in a variety of subjects, including wilderness trekking, nature photography, mountaineering, climbing, wilderness first aid, fly fishing, and leadership.  Classes are taught by volunteers and often involve lectures and field days.

Trips
Members of the club are able to sign up for trips, most of which take place within the state of Colorado.  Trips are led by volunteer trip leaders who handle the planning and organization as well as the execution.  Trips may include such activities as hiking, climbing, fishing, and photography and are offered at various levels of difficulty.  The club's adventure travel program also provides international travel opportunities.

Stewardship
The CMC has a conservation committee that is active in representing hiker interests in the state of Colorado.  It also conducts volunteer trail work throughout the state to help maintain and build hiking trails.

Fourteeners
The CMC is the official repository for summit registers on Colorado's popular fourteeners. It also maintains the comprehensive list of each person who has climbed all 53 of these high peaks.  It also provides a free online system called mySummits for hikers to report summits of Colorado's 100 highest peaks.

Notable club members throughout history
Carl Blaurock, one of a pair to first climb all of Colorado's fourteeners
Mary Cronin, first woman to climb all of Colorado's fourteeners
Albert Russell Ellingwood, pioneering Colorado mountaineer
Dick Lamm, former Governor of Colorado
Enos Mills, whose efforts were influential in establishing Rocky Mountain National Park
James Grafton Rogers, Denver lawyer and outdoorsman who drafted legislation to create Rocky Mountain National Park
Roger Toll, who held the positions of superintendent at Yellowstone, Rocky Mountain, and Mount Rainier National Parks
William Henry Jackson, famous photographer for the Detroit Photographic Company
Gerry Roach, Colorado-based climber who published numerous hiking guides and was second to climb the seven summits

References

External links
Colorado Mountain Club
Bradford Washburn American Mountaineering Museum
Henry S. Hall, Jr. American Alpine Club Library and Colorado Mountain Club Collection

Climbing organizations
Hiking organizations in the United States
Sports organizations established in 1912
Outdoor education organizations
Educational organizations based in the United States
Environmental organizations based in Colorado
1912 establishments in Colorado